A recent inquiry regarding the naming of the Zoneton community of Bullitt County led us to pull out an article written by Jeri Pitts and published in The Postboy on 4 Apr 1974.

We quote the following from that article.

"In 1875 this area consisted of scattered farms, a blacksmith shop, two schools, grist mills, general store, churches and a post office. Dr. J. R. Holsclaw was appointed postmaster and told to select a name (at that time the area had none). He had given considerable thought and was still undecided as to a name.

"One cold night returning from a house call, while walking along Preston Highway, back then called 'The Pike,' he was thinking about what to name the post office and the community. Ase he rode on horseback his attention was drawn to the ribbons of light made on Tanyard Branch by the moon shining though the bare tree limbs and the pike. This reminded him of something but what? He stopped and looked closer at these patterns. Oh, yes, it looked like zones on a map, he had his name, Zoneton...

"Even back then good things happened that deserve our remembrance today, he was completely unselfish in his selection of the name. It would have been normal for him to have used a name such as Holsclawburg or Holsclawville, thereby making his own name remembered after he was gone. But, he chose Zoneton, it was original and romantic in the way it was chosen."

Zoneton is an unincorporated community located in Bullitt County, Kentucky, United States.

It is served by the Zoneton Fire Protection District.

References

Unincorporated communities in Bullitt County, Kentucky
Unincorporated communities in Kentucky